Ora Egaro Jon is a 1972 Bengali historical drama film written by Al Masood and directed by Chashi Nazrul Islam, based on the Bangladesh Liberation War. Director Islam and lead actor Khosru Noman were both members of Mukti Bahini (liberation army). It was the first movie of Bangladesh after independence. It has been selected for preservation by the Bangladesh Film Archive.

Background
After Bangladesh won their independence, this was the first film about their liberation war.

Cast

 Khosru Noman
 Abdur Razzak
 Shabana
 Nuton
 Helal
 Gauhar Jamil 
 Rawshan Jamil
 Kazi Mehfuzul Haque
 Khalil
 Raj
 Raju Ahmed
 Hasan Imam
 Manu Dutta
 Altaf
 Mita
 Saifuddin
 ATM Shamsuzzaman

References

1972 films
1972 drama films
1972 war films
1970s Bengali-language films
Bengali-language Bangladeshi films
Bangladeshi war drama films
Films based on the Bangladesh Liberation War
Films set in 1971
Films scored by Khandaker Nurul Alam
Parvez Films films